Thorsten Mahrer (born 22 January 1990) is an Austrian footballer who plays for Austrian Bundesliga club Austria Klagenfurt.

References

Austrian footballers
Austrian Football Bundesliga players
2. Liga (Austria) players
1990 births
Living people
SV Mattersburg players
SK Austria Klagenfurt players
Association football defenders